The French Institute in India is part of the worldwide network of "French institutes". The Delhi office is the only one in India, the Pondichery antenna of the institute being a research facility more than a cultural centre.

Background 
This French Institute was inaugurated on 29 March 2012 by Mr Xavier Darcos, then president of the French Institute alliance.
However, French cultural activities in Delhi have existed under various forms before the official opening of the institute. Before 2012, all cultural activities related to the French embassy were supervised by Culturesfrance.

The French Institute entertains close links with the French Embassy in India, New Delhi, the local Alliance Française and other French-teaching establishments like the Lycée Français de Delhi.

The Lycée français de Delhi and the Centre for Social Research and Humanities are also based within its walls. 
It is located next to the 5 stars hotel 'Taj Mahal', the Parsi cemetery and a few hundred meters from the Rajpath and India Gate

Mission 
The institute’s cultural center participates actively to the local and national art scene, by organising dozens of cultural events every year, on a local, regional or national basis. It also participates to external events, within the promotion of friendly ties between France and other francophone countries and India.

It cooperates intimately with Indian universities to propose joint courses to Indian and French students alike. In 2011 alone, 2500 Indian students chose to study in France via the joint programs created by the Institut français.

See also 

 France–India relations
 Lycée français de Pondichéry
 French culture

References

External links 
 Official website
 Campus France - India
 French Institute Delhi
Institut Français
Education in Delhi
French culture
Educational institutions in India
Francophonie
Cultural organisations based in India
Language advocacy organizations
Language education organizations
Language education in India
France–India relations